is a Japanese independent film studio. It was formed in 1950 by directors Kōzaburō Yoshimura and Kaneto Shindo and actor Taiji Tonoyama, and went on to produce most of Shindo's films, such as The Naked Island and Onibaba.

History

Kindai Eiga Kyōkai was formed in 1950 when Kōzaburō Yoshimura and Kaneto Shindo decided to leave the Shochiku production company. It was formed together with actor Taiji Tonoyama.

By 1960, the film company was almost bankrupt. With little money left, Shindo decided to make one last film, The Naked Island. This was a hit abroad, winning a prize at the Moscow Film Festival, and the money earned by signing foreign distribution rights was enough to keep the company afloat.

Throughout its history, the company was never highly profitable, with profits being reinvested into making more films.

Productions

References

Bibliography

External links
 
Kindai Eiga Kyokai at the Internet Movie Database

Film production companies of Japan
1950 establishments in Japan